Zavitsa is a mountain in the Peloponnese, known in antiquity as Timenion Oros, meaning Timenion mountain. Its contemporary name comes from the slavic word "zavičaj" which means "homeland". It lies on the northeastern edges of Arcadia, marking the natural boundaries with Argolis to the north. Its highest peak is Profitis Ilias rising at 974 meters above sea level. Its easternmost slopes reach the Arcadian coasts that form part of the wider Argolic Gulf area. Astros, Xiropigado, Kato Vervena, Kato Doliana and Prosilia are villages located around its slopes.

See also

List of mountains in Greece

Landforms of Arcadia, Peloponnese
Mountain ranges of Greece